Alfred Thomas "Fred" Evans (24 February 1914 – 13 April 1987) was a British Labour Party politician.  Evans was Member of Parliament for Caerphilly from a 1968 by-election until 1979, when he retired.

Biography

Evans was born into a miner's family in 1914. He was educated at both primary and grammar schools at Bargoed and went on to study at the University College of Wales Cardiff. He married Mary Katharine O'Marah in 1939 and they had a son and two daughters.

Evans was head of the English Department at Bargoed Grammar School (1937–1949), headmaster of Bedlinog Secondary School (1949–1966), and headmaster of Lewis Boys Grammar School in Pengam (1966–1968).

Evans was Agent to the Ness Edwards, (then MP for Caerphilly), and a Councillor on Gelligaer Urban District Council 1948–1951. He contested unsuccessfully for the Labour Party the Leominster division of Herefordshire in 1955 and the Stroud division of Gloucestershire in 1959. He sat as MP (Labour) for the Caerphilly division of Glamorganshire from 1968 until 1979 when he retired. He died in 1987 aged 73.

References

Times Guide to the House of Commons October 1974

1914 births
1987 deaths
Welsh Labour Party MPs
UK MPs 1966–1970
UK MPs 1970–1974
UK MPs 1974
UK MPs 1974–1979